The NATO Integrated Air Defense System (short: NATINADS) is a command and control network combining radars and other facilities spread throughout the NATO alliance's air defence forces. It formed in the mid-1950s and became operational in 1962 as NADGE. It has been constantly upgraded since its formation, notably with the integration of Airborne Early Warning aircraft in the 1970s. The United Kingdom maintained its own network, but was fully integrated with the network since the introduction of the Linesman/Mediator network in the 1970s. Similarly, the German network maintained an independent nature through GEADGE.

Development 
Development was approved by the NATO Military Committee in December 1955. The system was to be based on four air defense regions (ADRs) coordinated by SACEUR (Supreme Allied Commander Europe). Starting from 1956 early warning coverage was extended across Western Europe using 18 radar stations. This part of the system was completed by 1962. Linked to existing national radar sites the coordinated system was called the NATO Air Defence Ground Environment (NADGE).

From 1960 NATO countries agreed to place all their air defence forces under the command of SACEUR in the event of war. These forces included command & control (C2) systems, radar installations, and Surface-to-Air (SAM) missile units as well as interceptor aircraft.

By 1972 NADGE was converted into NATINADS consisting of 84 radar sites and associated Control Reporting Centers (CRC) and in the 1980s the Airborne Early Warning / Ground Environment Integration Segment (AEGIS) upgraded the NATINADS with the possibility to integrate the AWACS radar picture and all of its information into its visual displays. (NOTE: This AEGIS is not to be confused with the U.S.Navy AEGIS, a shipboard fire control radar and weapons system.) AEGIS processed the information through Hughes H5118ME computers, which replaced the H3118M computers installed at NADGE sites in the late 1960s and early 1970s.

NATINADS ability to handle data increased with faster clock rates. The H5118M computer had a staggering 1 megabyte of memory and could handle 1.2 million instructions per second while the former model had a memory of only 256 kilobytes and a clock speed of 150,000 instructions per seconds.

NATINADS/AEGIS were complemented, in West Germany by the German Air Defence Ground Environment (GEADGE), an updated radar network adding the southern part of Germany to the European system and Coastal Radar Integration System (CRIS), adding data links from Danish coastal radars.

In order to counter the hardware obsolescence, during the mid-1990s NATO started the AEGIS Site Emulator (ASE) program allowing the NATINADS/AEGIS sites to replace the proprietary hardware (the 5118ME computer and the various operator consoles IDM-2, HMD-22, IDM-80) with commercial-off-the-shelf (COTS) servers and workstations.

In the first years 2000, the initial ASE capability was expanded with the possibility to run, thanks to the new hardware power, multiple site emulators on the same hardware, so the system was renamed into Multi-AEGIS Site Emulator (MASE). The NATO system designed to replace MASE in the near future is the Air Command and Control System (ACCS).

Because of changing politics, NATO expanding and financial crises most European (NATO) countries are trying to cut defence budgets; as a direct result, many obsolete and outdated NATINADS facilities are phased out earlier. As of 2013, operational NATO radar sites in Europe are as follows:

Allied Air Command 
Allied Air Command (AIRCOM) is the central command of all NATO air forces on the European continent. The command is based at Ramstein Air Base in Germany and has two subordinate commands in Germany and Spain. The Royal Canadian Air Force and United States Air Force fall under command of the Canadian/American North American Aerospace Defense Command.

 Allied Air Command, at Ramstein Air Base, Germany
 CAOC Torrejón, at Torrejón Air Base, Spain - responsible for the airspace South of the Alps
 Albania: Air Surveillance Centre, at Tirana International Airport
 Bulgaria: Air Sovereignty Operations Centre, in Sofia 
 Croatia: Airspace Surveillance Centre, in Podvornica
 Greece: Air Operations Centre, at Larissa Air Base
 Italy: National Air and Space Operations Centre, in Poggio Renatico
 Montenegro: Air Surveillance and Reporting Centre, at Podgorica Airport
 Portugal: Control and Reporting Centre, in Monsanto
 Romania: Air Operations Center, in Bucharest 
 Slovenia: Airspace Surveillance and Control Centre, in Brnik
 Spain: Air Operations Centre, in Torrejón
 Central Command and Control Group, at Torrejón Air Base
 Northern Command and Control Group, at Zaragoza Air Base
 Turkey: Control and Reporting Centre, in Ahlatlıbel
 CAOC Uedem, in Uedem, Germany - responsible for the airspace North of the Alps
 Baltic Air Surveillance Network - Regional Airspace Surveillance Coordination Centre, in Karmėlava
 Estonia: Air Operations Control Centre, at Ämari Air Base
 Latvia: Air Operations Centre, at Lielvārde Air Base
 Lithuania: Airspace Control Centre, in Karmėlava
 Belgium: Control and Reporting Centre, at Beauvechain Air Base
 Czech Republic: Control and Reporting Centre, in Hlavenec
 Denmark: Control and Reporting Centre, at Karup Air Base
 France: Control and Reporting Centre, at Mont Verdun Air Base
 Germany: Air Operations Centre, in Uedem
 Control and Reporting Centre 2, in Erndtebrück
 Control and Reporting Centre 3, in Schönewalde
 Hungary: Air Operations Centre, in Veszprém
 Iceland: Control and Reporting Centre, at Keflavik Air Base
 Luxembourg: airspace controlled by Belgium's Control and Reporting Centre, at Beauvechain Air Base
 Netherlands: Control and Reporting Centre, in Nieuw-Milligen
 Norway: Control and Reporting Centre, in Sørreisa
 Poland: Air Operations Centre, in Warsaw-Pyry
 22nd Command and Control Centre, in Osówiec
 32nd Command and Control Centre, in Balice
 Slovakia: Air Operations Centre, at Sliač Air Base
 United Kingdom: Control and Reporting Centre, at RAF Boulmer

Radar stations

Albania 
The Albanian Air Force operates Lockheed Martin AN/TPS-77 radars.

Belgium 
The Belgian Air Component's Control and Reporting Centre was based at Glons, where also its main radar was located. The radar was deactivated in 2015 and the Centre moved to Beauvechain Air Base in 2020. The Belgian Control and Reporting Centre reports to CAOC Uedem in Germany and is also responsible for guarding the airspace of Luxembourg. At the new location the Control and Reporting Centre uses digital radar data of the civilian radars of Belgocontrol and the Marconi S-723 radar of the Air Component's Air Traffic Control Centre in Semmerzake.

Bulgaria 
The Bulgarian Air Force's Air Sovereignty Operations Centre is located in Sofia and reports to CAOC Torrejón. The Bulgarian Air Force fields three control and surveillance zones, which operate obsolete Soviet-era radars. The Bulgarian Air Force intends to replace these radars with fewer, but more capable Western 3-D radars as soon as possible. The future locations of the new radars are as of 2018 unknown.

 Joint Forces Command, in Sofia
 Air Sovereignty Operational Center (ASOC), in Sofia 
 Base Operative Center (part of 3rd Air Base), Graf Ignatievo Air Base, operational control of fighter aviation
 Command, Control and Surveillance Base, in Sofia
 1st Control and Surveillance Zone, in Bozhurishte, Sofia Province
 2nd Control and Surveillance Zone, in Trud, Plovdiv Province
 3rd Control and Surveillance Zone, in Bratovo, Burgas Province

Canada 
The Royal Canadian Air Force's control centres and radar stations are part of the Canadian/American North American Aerospace Defense Command.

Croatia 

The Croatian Air Force and Air Defense's Airspace Surveillance Centre is headquartered in Podvornica and reports to CAOC Torrejón.

 Air Force and Air Defense Command
 Airspace Surveillance and Control Battalion, at 91st Air Force Base (Zagreb - Pleso)
 Airspace Surveillance Centre, in Podvornica
 Sector Operational Centre, in Split
 Mount Sljeme Radar Post, with AN/FPS-117(E)1T
 Borinci Radar Post, with AN/FPS-117(E)1T
 Papuk Radar Post, with AN/FPS-117(E)1T
 Učka Radar Post, with AN/FPS-117(E)1T
 Mount Rota, with AN/FPS-117(E)1T

Czech Republic 

The Czech Air Force's Control and Reporting Centre is located in Hlavenec and reports to CAOC Uedem.

 Air Force Command, in Prague
 26th Air Command, Control and Surveillance Regiment, in Stará Boleslav
 261st Control and Reporting Centre (CRC), in Hlavenec
 262nd Radiotechnical Battalion, in Hlavenec
 1st Radiotechnical Company, in Nepolisy, with RAT-31DL
 4th Radiotechnical Company, in Sokolnice, with RAT-31DL
 263nd Support Battalion, in Hlavenec
 Reserve Control and Reporting Centre, in Větrušice

Denmark 

The Royal Danish Air Force's Combined Air Operations Centre (CAOC 1) in Finderup was deactivated in 2008 and replaced at the same location by the Combined Air Operations Centre Finderup (CAOC F), which had responsibility for the airspaces of Iceland, Norway, Denmark and the United Kingdom. CAOC F was deactivated in 2013 and its responsibilities were transferred to CAOC Uedem in Germany. The national Danish Control and Reporting Centre is located at Karup Air Base and it reports to CAOC Uedem.

The Thule Air Base in Greenland is a United States Air Force installation and its radars are part of the North American Aerospace Defense Command.

 Air Force Tactical Command, at Karup Air Base
 Air Control Wing, at Karup Air Base
 Control and Reporting Centre, at Karup Air Base
 Radar Station Skagen, in Skagen, with RAT-31DL
 Radar Station Skrydstrup, at Skrydstrup Air Base, with AN/TPS-77
 Radar Station Bornholm, in Almindingen, with Marconi S-723

Estonia 

The Estonian Air Force's Air Operations Control Centre is located at Ämari Air Base and reports to the Baltic Air Surveillance Network's Regional Airspace Surveillance Coordination Centre (RASCC) in Karmėlava, Lithuania, which in turn reports to CAOC Uedem.

 Air Force Command, in Tallinn
 Air Surveillance Wing, at Ämari Air Base 
 Air Operations Control Centre, at Ämari Air Base
 Engineering and Technical Group, at Ämari Air Base
 Radar Station, in Levalõpme, with GM 403
 Radar Station, in Otepää, with GM 403
 Radar Station, in Kellavere, with AN/TPS-77(V)
 Airport Surveillance Radar at Ämari Air Base, with ASR-8

France 

The French Air and Space Force's Air Operations Centre is located at Mont Verdun Air Base and reports to CAOC Uedem. Most French radar sites use the PALMIER radar, which is being taken out of service. By 2022 all PALMIER radars will have been replaced with new radar stations using the GM 403 radar.

 Air Defense and Air Operations Command
 Air Operations Brigade, at Mont Verdun Air Base
 Air Operations Centre, at Mont Verdun Air Base
 Control and Reporting Centre, at Mont-de-Marsan Air Base
 Control and Reporting Centre, in Cinq-Mars-la-Pile
 Mont Verdun Air Base radar, with GM GM 406
 Élément Air Rattaché (EAR) 943, on Mont Agel, with GM 406

Additionally the French Air and Space Force fields a GM 406 radar at the Cayenne-Rochambeau Air Base in French Guiana to protect the Guiana Space Centre in Kourou.

Germany 

The German Air Force's Combined Air Operations Centre (CAOC 2) in Uedem was deactivated in 2008 and reactivated as CAOC Uedem in 2013. CAOC Uedem is responsible for the NATO airspace North of the Alps. The HADR radars are a variant of the HR-3000 radar, while the RRP-117 radars are a variant of the AN/FPS-117.

 Air Operations Centre (Zentrum Luftoperationen der Luftwaffe) (NATO CAOC Uedem), in Uedem
 Control and Reporting Centre 2 (Einsatzführungsbereich 2), in Erndtebrück
 Operations Squadron 21, in Erndtebrück
 Operations Support Squadron 22, in Erndtebrück
 Sensor Platoon I, in Lauda
 Remote Radar Post 240 "Loneship", in Erndtebrück with GM 406F
 Remote Radar Post 246 "Hardwheel", on Erbeskopf with HADR
 Remote Radar Post 247 "Batman", in Lauda with GM 406F
 Remote Radar Post 248 "Coldtrack", in Freising with GM 406F
 Remote Radar Post 249 "Sweet Apple", in Meßstetten with HADR
 Sensor Platoon II, in Auenhausen
 Remote Radar Post 241 "Crabtree", in Marienbaum with HADR
 Remote Radar Post 242 "Backwash", in Auenhausen with GM 406F
 Remote Radar Post 243 "Silver Cork", in Visselhövede with GM 406F
 Remote Radar Post 244 "Round up", in Brockzetel with HADR
 Remote Radar Post 245 "Bugle", in Brekendorf with GM 406F
 Control and Reporting Training Inspection 23, in Erndtebrück
 Education and Training Centre, in Erndtebrück
 Education, Test and Training Group, in Erndtebrück
 Control and Reporting Centre 3 (Einsatzführungsbereich 3), in Schönewalde
 Operations Squadron 31, in Schönewalde
 Operations Support Squadron 32, in Schönewalde
 Sensor Platoon III, in Cölpin
 Remote Radar Post 351 "Matchpoint", in Putgarten with RRP-117
 Remote Radar Post 352 "Mindreader", in Cölpin with RRP-117
 Remote Radar Post 353 "Teddy Bear", in Tempelhof with RRP-117
 Remote Radar Post 356 "", in Elmenhorst with RRP-117
 Sensor Platoon IV, in Regen
 Remote Radar Post 354 "Blackmoor", in Döbern with RRP-117
 Remote Radar Post 355 "Royal Flash", in Gleina with RRP-117
 Remote Radar Post 357 "", on Döbraberg with RRP-117
 Remote Radar Post 358 "Snow Cap", on Großer Arber with RRP-117

Greece

1st Area Control Centre, inside Mount Chortiatis, with Marconi S-743D
2nd Area Control Centre, inside Mount Parnitha, with Marconi S-743D
9th Control and Warning Station Squadron, on Mount Pelion, with Marconi S-743D
10th Control and Warning Station Squadron, on Mount Chortiatis, with Marconi S-743D

The Hellenic Air Force's Combined Air Operations Centre (CAOC 7) at Larissa Air Base was deactivated in 2013 and its responsibilities transferred to the CAOC Torrejón in Spain. The Hellenic Air Force fields two HR-3000, four AR-327 and six Marconi S-743D radar systems, however as of 2018 the air force is in the process of replacing some of its older systems with three RAT-31DL radars.

 Air Force Tactical Command, at Larissa Air Base
 Air Operations Centre, at Larissa Air Base
 1st Area Control Centre, inside Mount Chortiatis
 2nd Area Control Centre, inside Mount Parnitha
 1st Control and Warning Station Squadron, in Didymoteicho, with AR-327
 2nd Control and Warning Station Squadron, on Mount Ismaros, with HR-3000
 3rd Control and Warning Station Squadron, on Mount Vitsi, with Marconi S-743D
 4th Control and Warning Station Squadron, on Mount Elati, with RAT-31DL
 5th Control and Warning Station Squadron, in Kissamos, with Marconi S-743D
 6th Control and Warning Station Squadron, on Mykonos, with AR-327
 7th Control and Warning Station Squadron, on Mount Mela, with AR-327
 8th Control and Warning Station Squadron, on Lemnos, with AR-327
 9th Control and Warning Station Squadron, on Mount Pelion, with Marconi S-743D
 10th Control and Warning Station Squadron, on Mount Chortiatis, with Marconi S-743D
 11th Control and Warning Station Squadron, in Ziros, with HR-3000

Hungary 

The Hungarian Air Force's Air Operations Centre is located in Veszprém and reports to CAOC Uedem. There are additional three radar companies with Soviet-era equipment subordinate to the 54th Radar Regiment "Veszprém", however it is unclear if they will remain in service once Hungary's newest radar at Medina reaches full operational capability.

 Air Force Command, in Budapest
 Air Operations Centre, in Veszprém
 54th Radar Regiment "Veszprém", in Veszprém
 1st Radar Data Centre, in Békéscsaba, with RAT-31DL
 2nd Radar Data Centre, in Medina, with RAT-31DL
 3rd Radar Data Centre, in Bánkút, with RAT-31DL

Iceland 

The Iceland Air Defense System, which is part of the Icelandic Coast Guard, monitors Iceland's airspace. Air Defense is provided by fighter jets from NATO allies, which rotate units for the Icelandic Air Policing mission to Keflavik Air Base.
The Iceland Air Defense System's Control and Reporting Centre is at Keflavik Air Base and reports to CAOC Uedem in Germany.

 Iceland Air Defense System, at Keflavik Air Base
 Control and Reporting Centre, at Keflavik Air Base
 H1 Radar Station, at Miðnesheiði, with AN/FPS-117(V)5
 H2 Radar Station, on Mount Gunnolfsvík, with AN/FPS-117(V)5
 H3 Radar Station, at Stokksnes, with AN/FPS-117(V)5
 H4 Radar Station, on Mount Bolafjalli, with AN/FPS-117(V)5

Italy 

The Italian Air Force's Combined Air Operations Centre (CAOC 5) in Poggio Renatico was deactivated in 2013 and replaced with the Mobile Command and Control Regiment (RMCC) at Bari Air Base, while the Centre's responsibilities were transferred to the CAOC Torrejón in Spain.

 Air Operations Command (COA), in Poggio Renatico
 Air Operations Centre, in Poggio Renatico
 Integrated Missile Air-defense Regiment (Rep. DAMI), in Poggio Renatico
 11th Integrated Missile Air-defense Squadron, in Poggio Renatico 
 22nd Air Force Radar Squadron (GrRAM), in Licola, with AN/FPS-117(V)
 112th Remote Radar Station Flight, in Mortara, with RAT-31DL
 113th Remote Radar Station Flight, in Lame di Concordia, with RAT-31DL
 114th Remote Radar Station Flight, in Potenza Picena, with RAT-31DL
 115th Remote Radar Station Flight, in Capo Mele, with RAT-31DL
 121st Remote Radar Station Flight, in Poggio Ballone, with AN/FPS-117(V)
 123rd Remote Radar Station Flight, in Capo Frasca, with AN/FPS-117(V)
 131st Remote Radar Station Flight, in Jacotenente, with RAT-31DL
 132nd Remote Radar Station Flight, in Capo Rizzuto, with RAT-31DL
 133rd Remote Radar Station Flight, in San Giovanni Teatino, with AN/FPS-117(V)
 134th Remote Radar Station Flight, in Lampedusa, with RAT-31DL
 135th Remote Radar Station Flight, in Marsala, with RAT-31DL
 136th Remote Radar Station Flight, in Otranto, with RAT-31DL
 137th Remote Radar Station Flight, in Mezzogregorio, with RAT-31DL

Latvia 

The Latvian Air Force's Air Operations Centre is located at Lielvārde Air Base and reports to the Baltic Air Surveillance Network's Regional Airspace Surveillance Coordination Centre (RASCC) in Karmėlava, Lithuania, which in turn reports to CAOC Uedem.

 Air Force Headquarters, at Lielvārde Air Base 
 Air Surveillance Squadron, at Lielvārde Air Base
 Air Operations Centre, at Lielvārde Air Base
 1st Radiotechnical (Radar) Post, at Lielvārde Air Base, with AN/TPS-77(V)
 2nd Radiotechnical (Radar) Post, in Audriņi, with AN/TPS-77(V)
 3rd Radiotechnical (Radar) Post, in Čalas, with AN/TPS-77(V)
 Mobile Radar Section, with TPS-77 MRR

Lithuania 

The Lithuanian Air Force's Air Operations Control Centre is located in Karmėlava and reports to the Baltic Air Surveillance Network's Regional Airspace Surveillance Coordination Centre (RASCC) co-located in Karmėlava, which in turn reports to CAOC Uedem.

 Lithuanian Air Force Headquarters, in Kaunas
 Airspace Surveillance and Control Command, in Kaunas
 Airspace Control Centre, in Karmėlava
 1st Radar Post, in Antaveršis
 3rd Radar Post, in Degučiai
 4th Radar Post, in Ceikiškės

Luxembourg 
Luxembourg's airspace is monitored and guarded by the Belgian Air Component's Control and Reporting Centre at Beauvechain Air Base.

Montenegro 
The Armed Forces of Montenegro do not possess a modern air defense radar and the country's airspace is monitored by Italian Air Force radar sites. The Armed Forces Air Surveillance and Reporting Centre is located at Podgorica Airport in Golubovci and reports to CAOC Torrejón in Spain.

Netherlands 

The Royal Netherlands Air Force's Air Operations Centre is located at Nieuw-Milligen and reports to CAOC Uedem. The air force's main radars are being replaced with two modern SMART-L GB radars.

 Air Force Command, in The Hague
 Air Operations Control Station, in Nieuw-Milligen
 Control and Reporting Centre, in Nieuw-Milligen
 Radar Station South, in Nieuw-Milligen, with SMART-L GB
 Radar Station North, at Wier, with SMART-L GB

Norway 

The Royal Norwegian Air Force's Combined Air Operations Centre (CAOC 3) in Reitan was deactivated in 2008 and its responsibilities were transferred to the Combined Air Operations Centre Finderup (CAOC F). After CAOC F was deactivated in 2013 the responsibility for the air defense of Norway was transferred to CAOC Uedem in Germany and the Royal Norwegian Air Force's Control and Reporting Centre in Sørreisa reports to it. Until 2016 the Royal Norwegian Air Force's radar installations were distributed between two CRCs. That year the CRC Mågerø was disbanded. In its place a wartime mobilization back-up CRC has been formed with a reduction in personnel from the around active 170 duty to about 50 air force home guardsmen. The SINDRE I radars are a variant of the HR-3000 radar, which is also used in the German HADR radars. The newer RAT-31SL/N radars are sometimes designated SINDRE II.

 Armed Forces Operational Headquarters, Reitan near Bodø Main Air Station
 131 Air Wing, in Sørreisa
 Control and Reporting Centre Sørreisa
 Radar Station Njunis, with RAT-31SL/N
 Radar Station Senja, with RAT-31SL/N
 Radar Station Honningsvåg, with RAT-31SL/N
 Radar Station Vestvågøy, with SINDRE I
 Radar Station Vågsøy, with SINDRE I
 Radar Station Skykula, with SINDRE I

Poland 

The Polish Armed Forces Operational Command's Air Operations Centre is located in the Warsaw-Pyry neighborhood and reports to CAOC Uedem. The 3rd Wrocław Radiotechnical Brigade is responsible for the operation of the Armed Forces radar equipment. As of 2021, the Polish Air Force possesses three NUR-12M and three RAT-31DL long-range radars making up BACKBONE system, which are listed below.

 Armed Forces Operational Command, in Warsaw
 Air Operations Centre - Air Component Command, in Warsaw-Pyry
 Mobile Air Operations Command Unit, in Babki
 22nd Command and Control Centre, in Osówiec
 32nd Command and Control Centre, at Kraków-Balice Air Base
 1st Air Operations Coordination Centre, in Gdynia
 2nd Air Operations Coordination Centre, in Kraków
 4th Air Operations Coordination Centre, in Szczecin
 3rd Wrocław Radiotechnical Brigade, in Wrocław
 3rd Sandomierz Radiotechnical Battalion, in Sandomierz
 110th Long Range Radiolocating Post, in Łabunie, with RAT-31DL
360th Long Range Radiolocating Post, in Brzoskwinia, with NUR-12M
 8th Szczycień Radiotechnical Battalion, in Lipowiec
144th Long Range Radiolocating Post, in Roskosz, with NUR-12M
184th Long Range Radiolocating Post, in Szypliszki, with RAT-31DL
 211th Long Range Radiolocating Post, in Chruściel, with RAT-31DL
 31st Lower Silesian Radiotechnical Battalion, in Wrocław
170th Long Range Radiolocating Post, in Wronowice, with NUR-12M
 34th Chojnice Radiotechnical Battalion, in Chojnice

Portugal 

The Portuguese Air Force's Combined Air Operations Centre (CAOC 10) in Lisbon was deactivated in 2013 and its responsibilities were transferred to CAOC Torrejón in Spain.

 Air Command, in Lisbon
 Control and Reporting Centre, in Monsanto
 Radar Station 1, on Monte Fóia, with HR-3000
 Radar Station 2, on Monte Pilar in Paços de Ferreira, with HR-3000
 Radar Station 3, at Montejunto, with HR-3000
 Radar Station 4, on Pico do Arieiro, on the island of Madeira, with LANZA 3-D

Romania 

The Romanian Air Force's Air Operations Centre is headquartered in Bucharest and reports to CAOC Torrejón. The radar station in Bârnova is officially designated and operated as a civilian radar station, however its data is fed into the military air surveillance system.

 Air Operations Centre, in Bucharest
 2nd Airspace Surveillance Centre "North", at 71st Air Base, in Câmpia Turzii
 Radar Station, in Ovidiu, with AN/FPS-117(V)
 Radar Station, at Giarmata Airport, with AN/FPS-117(V)
 Radar Station, in Suceava, with AN/FPS-117(V)
 Radar Station, in Craiova, with AN/FPS-117(V)
 Radar Station, on Muntele Mare, with AN/FPS-117(V)
 Civil/Military Radar Station, in Bârnova, with AN/FPS-117(V)

Slovakia 
The Slovak Air Force's Air Operations Centre is located at Sliač Air Base and reports to CAOC Uedem. The Slovak Air Force still operates obsolete Soviet-era radars, which it intends to replace with fewer, but more capable Western 3-D radars as soon as possible. The future locations of the new radars are as of 2018 unknown.

 Air Force Command, at Sliač Air Base
 Command, Control and Surveillance Wing, at Sliač Air Base
 Air Operations Centre, at Sliač Air Base
 Radar Surveillance Battalion, in Sliač Air Base

Slovenia 

The Slovenian Air Force and Air Defense's Airspace Surveillance and Control Centre is headquartered in Brnik and reports to CAOC Torrejón.

The Italian Air Force's 4th Wing at Grosseto Air Base and 36th Wing at Gioia del Colle Air Base rotate a QRA flight of Eurofighter Typhoons to Istrana Air Base, which are responsible for the air defense of Northern Italy and Slovenia.

 Forces Command, in Vrhnika
 15th Military Aviation Regiment, at Cerklje ob Krki Air Base
 16th Airspace Surveillance and Control Battalion in Brnik
 Airspace Surveillance and Control Centre, in Brnik
 1st Radar Station, in Vrhnika, with GM 403
 2nd Radar Station, in Hočko Pohorje, with GM 403

Spain 

The Spanish Air Force's Combined Air Operations Centre (CAOC 8) at Torrejón Air Base was deactivated in 2013 and replaced at same location by CAOC Torrejon, which took over the functions of CAOC 5, CAOC 7, CAOC 8 and CAOC 10. CAOC Torrejón is responsible for the NATO airspace South of the Alps.

 Combat Air Command, at Torrejón Air Base
 Combat Air Command Headquarter (CGMACOM), at Torrejón Air Base
 Air Operations Centre / NATO CAOC Torrejón
 Command and Control Systems Headquarter (JSMC), at Torrejón Air Base
 Central Command and Control Group (GRUCEMAC), at Torrejón Air Base
 Northern Command and Control Group (GRUNOMAC), at Zaragoza Air Base
 Mobile Air Control Group (GRUMOCA) at Tablada Air Base
 1st Air Surveillance Squadron (EVA 1) radar station, at Air Station El Frasno, with LANZA 3-D
 2nd Air Surveillance Squadron (EVA 2) radar station, at Air Station Villatobas, with RAT-31SL/T
 3rd Air Surveillance Squadron (EVA 3) radar station, at Air Station Constantina, with LANZA 3-D
 4th Air Surveillance Squadron (EVA 4) radar station, at Air Station Roses, with LANZA 3-D
 5th Air Surveillance Squadron (EVA 5) radar station, at Air Station Aitana, with RAT-31SL/T
 7th Air Surveillance Squadron (EVA 7) radar station, at Air Station Puig Major, with LANZA 3-D
 9th Air Surveillance Squadron (EVA 9) radar station, at Air Station Motril, with RAT-31SL/T
 10th Air Surveillance Squadron (EVA 10) radar station, at Air Station Barbanza, with LANZA 3-D
 11th Air Surveillance Squadron (EVA 11) radar station, at Air Station Alcalá de los Gazules, with LANZA 3-D
 12th Air Surveillance Squadron (EVA 12) radar station, at Air Station Espinosa de los Monteros, with RAT-31SL/T
 13th Air Surveillance Squadron (EVA 13) radar station, at Air Station Sierra Espuña, with LANZA 3-D
 21st Air Surveillance Squadron (EVA 21) radar station, at Vega de San Mateo on Gran Canaria, with LANZA 3-D
 22nd Air Surveillance Squadron (EVA 22) radar station, in Haría on Lanzarote, with RAT-31SL/T

Turkey 

The Turkish Air Force's Combined Air Operations Centre (CAOC 6) in Eskişehir was deactivated in 2013 and its responsibilities were transferred to CAOC Torrejón in Spain. Turkey's Air Force fields a mix of HR-3000, AN/FPS-117, RAT-31SL and RAT-31DL radars, however the exact number of each of these radar and their location in the Turkish radar system is unknown.

 Air Force Command (COA), in 
 Control and Reporting Centre, in Ahlatlıbel
 Aerial Surveillance Radar Post, in Ahlatlıbel, with 
 Aerial Surveillance Radar Post, in Körfez, with 
 Aerial Surveillance Radar Post, in Karabelen, with 
 Aerial Surveillance Radar Post, in Çanakkale, with 
 Aerial Surveillance Radar Post, in Erzurum, with 
 Aerial Surveillance Radar Post, in Datça, with 
 Aerial Surveillance Radar Post, in İnebolu, with 
 Aerial Surveillance Radar Post, in İskenderun, with 
 Aerial Surveillance Radar Post, in Rize, with

United Kingdom 

The Royal Air Force's Combined Air Operations Centre (CAOC 9) at RAF High Wycombe was deactivated in 2008 and its responsibilities were transferred to the Combined Air Operations Centre Finderup (CAOC F). After CAOC F was deactivated in 2013 the responsibility for the air defense of the United Kingdom was transferred to CAOC Uedem in Germany. The Royal Air Force's Control and Reporting Centres report to it.

 No. 1 Group RAF, at RAF High Wycombe
 UK Air Surveillance and Control Systems, at RAF Boulmer
 Control and Reporting Centre, at RAF Boulmer
 No. 1 Air Control Centre, at RAF Scampton (National Air Control Centre)
 RRH Benbecula, in North Uist, with AN/TPS-77
 RRH Brizlee Wood, in Shipley, with AN/FPS-117
 RRH Buchan, in Boddam, with AN/TPS-77
 RRH Portreath, in Portreath, with AR-327
 RRH Saxa Vord, in Unst, with AN/TPS-77
 RRH Trimingham, in Trimingham, with AN/FPS-117 (satellite station of RRH Neatishead)
 RRH Staxton Wold, in Scarborough, had an AN/TPS-77 radar, which was moved to RRH Saxa Vord in 2017, future plans for RRH Staxton Wold are as of 2018 unknown.

United States 
The United States Air Force's control centres and radar stations are part of the Canadian/American North American Aerospace Defense Command.

Non-NATO European air defense systems

Austria 

 Austrian Air Force - GOLDHAUBE system:
 Command and Control Center "Basisraum", in St Johann im Pongau
 Kolomansberg Radar Station
 Großer Speikkogel Radar Station
 Steinmandl Radar Station

Switzerland 

 Swiss Air Force - FLORAKO system:
 Air Defence & Direction Center, at Dübendorf Air Base
 Pilatus Radar Station
 Scopi Radar Station
 Weisshorn Radar Station
 Weissfluh Radar Station

References

Integrated Air Defense System
Air defence radar networks